Nicolas Desmaretz, marquis de Maillebois (10 September 1648, Paris – 4 May 1721, Paris) was a Controller-General of Finances during the reign of Louis XIV of France.

Desmaretz was a nephew of Jean-Baptiste Colbert.  Taken out of school at age 15 to work in his uncle's offices as Controller-General of Finances, he rose to become an intendant of finances in 1678 and his uncle's principal assistant in 1683.  He was exiled in December 1683 shortly after Colbert's death, however, after being accused of taking bribes and kickbacks in a government contract to mint money.  After returning to Paris in 1686, Desmaretz wrote a series of memoranda for his family members who were still in the government recommending new tax policies in the face of the deplorable economic situation of France.

Desmaretz was made director of finances in 1703 and replaced Michel Chamillart as controller general in 1708.  Desmaretz undertook several policies aimed at restoring France's financial status while in office, including postponing repayment of loans, securing lower interest rates on certain loans, creating a royal lottery, devaluing metal currency, and instituting a ten percent tax on the income produced by property ownership in 1710.  Desmaretz was working on a method for repaying France's debts when Louis XIV died on 1 September 1715.  He  was dismissed from office after Louis XIV's death that year.

His son Jean-Baptiste Francois Desmaretz, Marquis de Maillebois became a Marshal of France in 1741.

References

Further reading

 Stéphane Guerre, Nicolas Desmaretz, le Colbert oublié du roi soleil, France, Champ Vallon, 2019.
 McCollim, Gary B. 2012. "Louis XIV's Assault on Privilege: Nicolas Desmaretz and the Tax on Wealth". Rochester, NY: University of Rochester Press. .

1648 births
1721 deaths
17th-century French people
18th-century French people
French Ministers of Finance